Commodore Robert Lionel Brooke Cunliffe CBE (15 March 1895 – 29 November 1990) was a Royal Navy officer who became Commander-in-Chief, Dover.

Naval career
Cunliffe joined the Royal Navy in September 1912. He was present at the Battle of Jutland in June 1916 during the First World War. He became commanding officer of the sloop HMS Milford in December 1937. He also served during the Second World War as Captain of the Royal Naval College, Dartmouth, from December 1939, Commander-in-Chief, Dover, from April 1942 and captain of the aircraft carrier HMS Illustrious from August 1942. He went on to be Commodore, Royal Naval Barracks, Devonport in August 1944 before retiring in January 1946. While serving in the Royal Navy, Cunliffe played first-class cricket for the Royal Navy Cricket Club, making ten appearances between 1914–1929. He scored 335 runs at an average of 20.93, which included three half centuries and a high score of 87. With the ball, he took 16 wickets with his leg break googly bowling, with best figures of 5 for 78.

References

Sources

1895 births
1990 deaths
Royal Navy officers
English cricketers
Royal Navy cricketers
Royal Navy personnel of World War I
Commanders of the Order of the British Empire
Royal Navy personnel of World War II
Military personnel from Kent